Novica Šaulić (1888–1959) was a major Serbian ethnographer and folklorist along with Nikola Kašiković and Andrija Luburić. Šaulić always fought for Serbian self-determination during political strife in Montenegro.

Folklorists Milman Parry and Albert Lord used the collections of Šaulić, Kašiković and Luburić to record on phonographs the works of Serbian epic verse recited by guslars.

Works
 Narodne priče iz zbirke Novice Šaulića (1953)
 Prvi srpski ustanak: narodne pjesme (1954)
 Srpske narodne pesme: iz zbirke narodnih pesama (1936) 
 Srpske narodne priče iz zbirke narodnih pripovjedaka (1922)
 Srpske narodne priče (1925)

References 

1888 births
1959 deaths
Serbian folklorists
Serbian ethnographers